
Gmina Młynary is an urban-rural gmina (administrative district) in Elbląg County, Warmian-Masurian Voivodeship, in northern Poland.

Villages
Apart from the town of Młynary, Gmina Młynary contains the villages and settlements of Błudowo, Bronikowo, Broniszewo, Gardyny, Janiki Pasłęckie, Karszewo, Kobyliny, Krasinek, Kraskowo, Kurowo Braniewskie, Kwietnik, Mikołajki, Młynarska Wola, Nowe Monasterzysko, Nowe Sadłuki, Ojcowa Wola, Olszówka, Płonne, Podgórze, Rucianka, Sąpy, Sokolnik, Stare Monasterzysko, Sucha, Warszewo, Włóczyska, Zaścianki and Zastawno.

Neighbouring gminas
Gmina Młynary is bordered by the gminas of Frombork, Milejewo, Pasłęk, Płoskinia, Tolkmicko and Wilczęta.

References
Polish official population figures 2006

Mlynary
Elbląg County

de:Młynary#Gmina Młynary